The Nova Southeastern Sharks are the athletic teams that represent Nova Southeastern University, located in Davie, Florida, in intercollegiate sports as a member of the NCAA Division II ranks, primarily competing in the Sunshine State Conference (SSC) since the 2002–03 academic year. The Sharks previously competed in the Florida Sun Conference (FSC; now currently known as the Sun Conference since the 2008–09 school year) of the National Association of Intercollegiate Athletics (NAIA) from 1990–91 to 2001–02.

The Sunshine State Conference is often considered the "Conference of Champions", because of its national recognition.

Varsity teams

NSU competes in 16 intercollegiate varsity sports: Men's sports include baseball, basketball, cross country, golf, soccer, swimming & diving and track & field; while women's sports include basketball, cross country, golf, soccer, softball, swimming & diving, tennis, track & field and volleyball. Former sports included women's rowing until after the 2019–20 school year.

History
Nova Southeastern was originally an National Association of Intercollegiate Athletics (NAIA) institution back in the 1982–83 athletic season, which they would compete in their first conference affiliation home in the Florida Sun Conference from 1990 to 2002.

In 2002, Nova Southeastern University made the transition into Division II athletics. They finished their provisional membership in 2005, and are now eligible to compete for championships. In only four years the school has worked hard on recruiting and has brought most of the programs to the level of the Sunshine State Conference since 2002. In 2006–07, they built the new state-of-the-art University Center which most notably holds the Shark Tank, a multipurpose arena that is most commonly used as a basketball arena. The structure holds 5,500 fans.

The Sharks were originally called the Knights, which was from 1982 until 2004. In 2005, they unveiled the new Sharks logo and athletic mascot. The nickname was selected by the students of Nova Southeastern University. The university has also made great strides in increasing its spot offerings and putting as many student-athletes on the field as possible.

National championships
The Sharks have won eight team NCAA national championships, all at the Division II level.

Team

Facilities

University Center Shark Tank

The newest project for Nova Southeastern University, the University Center, opened in the summer of 2006. The University Center is now considered the hub of the university for all students. This is a multipurpose facility that serves for more than just athletics: it is also used for extracurricular activities as well as other leisure activities. The main arena, The Rick Case Arena, which seats 5,500, is the home for the Sharks intercollegiate athletic program, and will host all of NSU's volleyball and men's and women's basketball home games. With one main game court, the arena also has two practice/game –ready courts on the upper level. The arena also has the state-of-the-art capabilities to host concerts, lectures, special events and more for NSU and the surrounding community.

The Rick Case Arena features 5,500 seats, each with a seat back. The main court provides for over 1,200 permanent chair-back seats, while the upper level has over 4,000 seats. The upper-level houses the world's largest automated telescopic seating system, which adds over 2,000 chair-back seats on either side when extended.

The Rick Case Arena also features club level seating for boosters and donors. The area includes 66 cushioned seats overlooking the court, the area directly behind the head basket. Both seating sections are connected to the booster/donor room. Shark Club members, the donors and boosters, enjoy the comfort of the club level area which includes a suite with catering and other luxuries. These members also have the privilege of baseline seating for the best view possible.

AD Griffin Sports Complex
The AD Griffin Sports Complex is home to the Nova Southeastern University Softball team. This complex is equipped with 3 fields, 2 of them are used for practices, and then the main field used for games. All three field have lights so that they can allow the team to have night practices and games.

The Sharks softball team's main field overlooks Nova Southeastern University Health Professions Division Building. The three fields are all connected by the press box area. The pressbox looks over all three of the field, but is used mostly for the main field. Also, the AD Griffin complex is adjacent to the Miami Dolphins Training facility.

The AD Griffin Sports Complex was named in honor of Mr. A.D. Griffin, Sr.

NSU Baseball Complex

The NSU Baseball Complex is considered by many to be one of the finest baseball facilities in South Florida. This fully lit complex features a playing field with two outdoor batting cages. With the excellent facilities and connections to the Frontier Independent League, the university has seen many of its players advance to the next level. As stated the facilities and connections have been a huge stepping ground into the next level for NSU Sharks Baseball players.

Prior to the 2001 season, NSU added grandstand seating that accommodates 500 people and a fully functional press box.

The Baseball Complex is the site of The Frontier Independent Baseball League's annual player combine and tryouts.

NSU Soccer Complex
The NSU Soccer Complex consists of two practice fields and one game field. The game field is home for both the men's and women's soccer teams. All three fields come equipped with lights that allow for night practices and games. The game field features state-of-the-art grandstand seating with a capacity of 1,000 spectators. The stadium style seating is the newest addition to the complex, which was built prior to the 2000 season. The U.S. Women's National Soccer Team as well as several MLS teams, including the Miami Fusion have used NSU's complex as their training site.

The Orange Bowl Committee has entered into an agreement to use the NSU Soccer Complex as its official training site for one of its participants, which began with the 2003 FedEx Orange Bowl.

Miami Dolphins Training Facility

The Miami Dolphins Training Facility is located on the main campus of Nova Southeastern University. The facility was brought to the campus with connections through the Miami Dolphins; for example, the owner of the team, H. Wayne Huizenga, has the school's Business College named after him. The connection between the Dolphins, Huizenga and Nova Southeastern University is deep.

The state-of-the-art training facility of the Miami Dolphins football team includes one of the largest weight rooms in the NFL, training rooms, locker rooms, a therapy swimming pool, a cold-plunge pool and whirlpools, numerous administrative offices, and a practice field. It also has a bleacher building that can accommodate 2,000 spectators. The  facility is frequently used as a prototype for other professional football teams. The team's famous bubble has been a staple to both the campus and to the Dolphins. This facility has been a connection for Nova Southeastern University to connect with South Florida and build a relationship through athletics beyond their campus.

The facility has also been a practice facility for college football teams competing in Miami-area college bowl games. Nova Southeastern University and the Miami Dolphins have an agreement where one of the two Orange Bowl participants have the ability to practice at this facility. It has also been a host for Super Bowl teams; most recently, the Indianapolis Colts practiced there for Super Bowl XLI.

Mascot

Knights
Nova Southeastern University's athletics were originally known as the Knights. This name dates back to when the school was just Nova University. After the school merged with Southeastern University it was looking for a new identity to emerge for its athletic teams. The merger between the schools happened in 1994 when the school was still competing in the NAIA. They remained the Knights until the 2005 season.

Sharks
Upon completion of their reclassification period Nova Southeastern University wanted to complete its rebranding. In 2005, the administration put together a school wide contest to help create a new name for NSU athletics. After many rounds of voting the between the contest finalists the Stingrays and Sharks (both submitted by NSU law student, Rian Kinney), the university selected the shark as its new mascot. NSU is the one of only two college athletic teams to use the mascot Sharks with fellow Division II member Hawaii Pacific being the other. The shark mascot has become more than just an athletic logo, but also a symbol for the university. The Shark mascot has help brand Nova Southeastern University's identity.

Notable alumni

Baseball
 Rob Brzezinski
 J. D. Martinez
 Miles Mikolas
 Mike Fiers
 Carlos Asuaje
 Mark Calvi

Soccer  
 Lorcan Cronin
 Aly Hassan
 Darryl Gordon
 Darwin Lom
 Juan Ramos

Men's basketball
 Alex Gynes (NBL)
 Tommy Greer (NBL)
 Rhys Martin (NBL)
 Tim Coenraad (NBL)
 Shane McDonald (NBL)

Swimming & diving
 Esau Simpson
 David van der Colff

References

External links